Community newspapers in Hollywood, California, have included the Hollywood Sentinel (1903 or before-1911), Hollywood Inquirer (unknown-1914), Hollywood Citizen (1905–1931), Hollywood News, (unknown-1931),  and Hollywood Citizen-News (1931–1970).

Sentinel
In 1903, veteran publisher A.A. Bynon sold his interest in a newspaper called the Hollywood Sentinel to G.P. Sullivan,  who became the paper's editor. The Sentinel received the Hollywood city contract for printing legal advertising in December 1903. In 1904 C.N. Whitaker, former editor of the Monrovia Messenger, bought the business, but on November 1 Morris & Ponay of Portland, Oregon, took it over.

In 1905 Charles Mosteller of Los Angeles was the new owner of the Hollywood Sentinel. It was still being published in 1907 and 1909.

In 1909 Mosteller, identified as the Sentinel's managing editor, said the newspaper would begin a daily edition in June, which would compete with the Hollywood Citizen. It was explained that the legal advertising for the City of Hollywood (which was then independent from Los Angeles) had to be published in a daily newspaper, so both journals were switching from weekly to daily publication in order to bid on the contract.

The Los Angeles Herald  commented that each paper would try to underbid the other for the city's advertising and that "The fight, which promises to  be a hot one, will result in the city's printing being done at a greatly reduced figure, probably below cost, and in forcing the losing paper to the wall."
In 1909, the Sentinel office was the scene of a fist fight occasioned by the refusal of editor Herbert F. Clark to print the poetry of W.D. Cowley unless it were paid for as advertising. Cowley, who was the caretaker at the home of Los Angeles Times publisher Harrison Gray Otis, refused to do so, and Clark thereupon wrote a column "casting reflections upon the character of Cowley's poetry," according to a report in the Tacoma (Washington) Times.
"Cowley called at the Sentinel office to whip the editor and lost the battle," the Tacoma newspaper said.

In 1911 E.E. Brown purchased both the Hollywood Sentinel and the Hollywood Citizen and was to combine the two newspapers. "By so doing,"  wrote the Alma (Michigan) Record, "he will have control of the newspaper business in a town of  7,000 people only 10 miles from Los Angeles."

Inquirer

The Hollywood Inquirer was owned and published by Herschel Spencer Lander until 1914, when he sold out and moved to Paradise Valley, California.

Homer Fort, who had been editor of the Monrovia (California) Messenger, purchased the business from Jay E. Randall in 1915.

D.B. Peck was also an editor and publisher of the newspaper.

Mrs. Mary Clough Watson was its first editor. Harry Elliot was the newspaper's editor in June 1916 and Martin Luther Helpman in 1917.

O.M. Donaldson bought the Inquirer in 1918 from Douglas Edwards and changed the style, format and name "to conform with the ideals that had proven highly successful under his direction at Oak Park, Illinois." He sold the Inquirer around 1926 to Holly Leaves, Inc. (F.H. Hartwell, president).

Citizen and News

Titles and Dates
 1905-1921 (SN 92061588) Hollywood Citizen
 1921-1931 (SN 95061523) Hollywood Daily Citizen
 1931-1944 (SN 90051954) Hollywood Citizen-News
 1944-1945 (SN 99060913) Citizen-News
 1945-1948 (SN 99060914) Hollywood Citizen-News
 1948-1968 (SN 87062115) Citizen-News
 1968-1970 (SN 95061031) Hollywood Citizen News

Citizen (1905—1931)
The Hollywood Weekly Sentinel preceded the Hollywood Citizen.

The first edition of the Hollywood Citizen appeared as a four-page, six-column weekly on Sunday, April 23, 1905, measuring 16 by 22 inches. The Los Angeles Times said that "its neat appearance caused much favorable comment." It was established by Ezekial Dunton Taylor (1842–1917), a veteran newspaperman originally from Ohio, who came to Los Angeles in 1902, and his son-in-law, W.C. Parcher. Taylor was editor until 1910, when he moved to the Owens Valley Herald.

In 1911, Harlan G. Palmer, Sr., began publishing the Hollywood Citizen and was editor in 1917.

News
Ira C. Copley of Aurora, Illinois, purchased the Hollywood News and the Glendale Daily Press from Frederick William Kellogg of Kellogg Newspapers, Inc. (Pasadena Evening Post) and his son, William Scripps Kellogg, effective February 15, 1928.

He also bought the Alhambra Post-Advocate, Pasadena Evening Post, Monrovia Evening Post, Eagle Rock Daily Press, Burbank Daily Press, San Fernando Valley News, Sawtelle Evening Tribune, Santa Monica Evening Outlook, Venice Evening Vanguard, Culver City Star-News, Redondo Daily Breeze, Hermosa Daily Breeze and the San Pedro Daily News, effective September 1, 1928.

These latter papers were to be taken over and operated by the Southern California Newspapers Associated, of which Samuel G. McClure would become president and general manager. To make the transaction, Copley said, he assumed shares of ownership in the new group. McClure said that the Hollywood News would be immediately expanded, but that no changes would be made in the other papers.

Copley said that a holding company to be known as the Copley Press would be created by the succeeding September and that F.W. Kellogg would have an interest in it.

Citizen-News (1931—1970)
The Hollywood Citizen-News was a "flourishing medium-sized daily, concentrating its coverage on Hollywood," according to the Van Nuys News. "In the late 1930s, the paper led many a reform fight in local government."

Palmer Merger
Judge Harlan G. Palmer, the owner of the Hollywood Citizen since 1911, purchased the Hollywood News from Ira Copley in 1931 and combined the two papers under the name Citizen-News. The first issue appeared on Monday, November 2, 1931, published from the News building. The combined circulation was expected to reach "more than 30,000," it was said. The Citizen circulation was given as 20,000 and the News as "over 20,000."

Harlan G. Palmer, Sr. owned and published its successor, the Hollywood Citizen News from the 1931 until 1956.

In 1956, Harlan G. Palmer, Jr., took over as publisher of the Hollywood Citizen News, until it was sold in the 1960s, remaining an active publication until 1971.

The Hollywood Citizen News and the Valley Citizen News were published together.

Union activity

The editorial staff struck and picketed the plant on May 17, 1938, in the first walkout called by the American Newspaper Guild in California. Managing editor Harold Swisher said other workers were being hired and that production employees were on the job as usual. Publisher Harlan G. Palmer discharged three of the Guild members while negotiations were going on.

Sontag Company filed suit against the Los Angeles Newspaper Guild and others, contending it was damaged by union pickets at its Hollywood drug store.

A Superior Court judge issued a temporary restraining order against the union prohibiting it from picketing 166 companies that continued their advertising in the struck newspaper. The order against this secondary picketing was later made permanent.

The union took the matter to the National Labor Relations Board The strike ended on July 30, 1938, with an agreement between the two sides.

Superior Judge Emmet Wilson, however, ruled that six guild members he had cited for contempt of court must stand trial.

The union lost an appeal to the United States Circuit Court of Appeals which had been asked to rule on its claim, among others, that the company had violated labor law when it denied bylines to some employees who had been involved in the strike. The court held that it was within the right of the employer to make such a decision for business reasons.

Heyler ownership

Palmer died on July 25, 1956, and the publishership of the company was taken over by his son, Harlan G. Palmer Jr., who in 1961 sold it to David B. Heyler, owner of the Beverly Hills Citizen.

In January 1962, Heyler announced that the Citizen-News would have separate editions for three districts of the Los Angeles area: (1) Hollywood and the metropolitan area, (2) Beverly Hills west to Santa Monica, and (3) the San Fernando Valley.

Copeland ownership

In July 1964 Lammot du Pont Copeland Jr., owner of the Valley Times in the San Fernando Valley, purchased the stock of the Citizen-News, including twenty-seven weeklies operated in the Los Angeles area. A spokesman said it was the largest community-newspaper group in the United States.

Copeland appointed Richard M. Horton as publisher. The Los Angeles Times identified him as "a federal parolee with a long felony record and no previous newspaper experience." He had served time for a "real estate swindle in San Francisco and, later, parole violation."

The St. Louis Post-Dispatch said that Copeland acquired the Los Angeles newspapers "apparently as a forum for his ultra-conservative views." It said that revenues of the 27 weeklies in the Los Angeles group had fallen from $9 million a year to $5 million. Revenues were going to another group of weeklies that Copeland owned in Northern California, and he was paying himself a "consulting fee" of $13,000 a month.

The Citizen-News was merged with the Valley Times, which ceased publishing under its own name in spring 1969. 

The Hollywood newspaper changed its name to Los Angeles Evening Citizen News in March 1970 and attempted to gain readers by switching its editorial policy from conservative to liberal.

At one point in August 1970 a finance firm that was owed about half a million dollars sent in a team of security guards to take possession of the Citizen-News building. The next morning, according to the St. Louis Post-Dispatch, Richard Horton, the publisher,

assembled a small army of 300 employes, lawyers and hangers-on and at 6 a.m. the following day launched a counterattack. Horton and some confederates slipped through an open window . . .  The finance company still wouldn't agree to open the place up, so Horton told his employes to break in. They smashed several large plate glass windows and hustled — with the help of local police — the finance company guards out the door. The newspaper continued to publish for two weeks . . .

The company was seized by the Internal Revenue Service in August 1970 for nonpayment of taxes. On the same day its publishing company, Graphic Production Corp., filed a petition in bankruptcy court for an arrangement to pay its debts. The company went into receivership that month and was adjudged bankrupt on October 29, 1970.

Copeland filed a petition for personal bankruptcy in October 1970. It was the largest such action ever filed in the United States.

The final edition of the newspaper, with a black-bordered front page, was published on Friday, August 28, 1970. It had 321 employees, including 40 on the editorial staff. They had been working without pay in order to save the newspaper. The end meant there were only two daily newspapers published within the Los Angeles city limits, other than trade papers for the motion picture industry.

The assets of the newspaper company, including its real estate, the building, and everything in it, were sold at auction on May 11, 1971.

Office locations

The Citizen office was at 108 West Prospect Avenue in 1906 and at 1640 Cahuenga Avenue in 1912. The print shop was at 6426 Hollywood Boulevard in 1919.
The Palmer Building Corporation in 1921 was erecting a three-story structure at the corner of Hollywood Boulevard and Cosmo Street for a new plant, at an investment of $250,000. It was to be completed on December 1 of that year.

In 1930 a three-story art deco building designed by architect Francis D. Rutherford was built for Copley's Hollywood News at 1545 Wilcox Avenue, between Hollywood and Sunset boulevards.

It was opened on Wednesday, July 1, 1931, with a tour and reception featuring "public officials and film players." The offices were said to be "equipped with automatic Associated Press electric typewriters, financial tape machines, [and] teletypes for the City News Service." Other amenities were

Goss multiple-unit press with a capacity of 72,000 sixteen-page papers an hour, the latest in stereotyping, composing, engraving and photographic appurtenances, north-facing skylights, shower baths, lounges and sound-absorbing desks. Walls and ceilings have been made soundproof and floors insulated with a rubber-and-cork composition.

In 2006 the 75-year-old building "underwent a million-dollar renovation to cater to the tastes of tenants in the media and entertainment industries," according to the Los Angeles Times.

In 2014, S.E. Edinger, a real estate investor, bought the Citizen News Building.

Notable employees
 Homer D. King, managing editor
 Morton Thompson, writer

References

External links
 Furmanovsky, Michael. (1984) "'Cocktail Picket Party': The Hollywood Citizen-News Strike, the Newspaper Guild, and the Popularization of the 'Democratic Front' in Los Angeles". UCLA Historical Journal. PDF

Newspapers published in Greater Los Angeles
Hollywood, Los Angeles